Dropout or drop out may refer to:

 Dropping out, prematurely leaving school, college or university

Arts and entertainment

Film and television
 Dropout (film), a 1970 Italian drama 
 "The Dropout", a 1970 episode of The Brady Bunch
 The Dropout (podcast), 2019 true crime podcast
 The Dropout, a 2022 American miniseries based on the podcast

Music
 "Drop Out" (song), by Lil Pump, 2019
 "Drop Out," a song by Rocket from the Crypt from the 1995 album Scream, Dracula, Scream! 
 "Drop Out", a song by Converge from the 2004 album You Fail Me 
 "Drop Out", music of Dance Dance Revolution Extreme
 Drop Out with The Barracudas, by The Barracudas, 1981
 The Dropouts, an early incarnation of Priestess (band)

Science and technology
 Dropout (astronomy), a radiation source whose radiation intensity falls off sharply
 Dropout (bicycle part), a type of fork end
 Dropout (communications), a momentary loss of signal 
 Dropout (neural networks), a regularization technique for reducing overfitting

Other uses
 Dropout (streaming platform), an American subscription media service provider

See also 

 Drop out ceiling, beneath existing fire sprinklers 
 Turn on, tune in, drop out, a counterculture-era phrase popularized by Timothy Leary in 1966.